Drol is a video game published by Broderbund in 1983. It was originally written for the Apple II by Benny Aik Beng Ngo, and was ported to the Commodore 64 and Atari 8-bit family. It appeared for the SG-1000 in 1985 and Amiga in 1991.

Gameplay

The player controls a robot flying through a four story maze, attempting to rescue people and animals while avoiding traps and enemies such as alien creatures, snakes, eagles, magnets and axes. There are only three levels, but the game repeatedly starts over in a more difficult version if the third level is completed. In the third level of some versions, in order to reach the final floor without being eaten by a plant sprouting from out of nowhere, the player must choose between three different trapdoors, and the correct trapdoor varies from game to game.

Reception
Run magazine, reviewing the Commodore 64 version in May 1984, gave it an "A"–its highest rating—and described it as "fun, funny, and exciting," although it was criticized for slow loading times. In 1984 Softline readers named the game the seventh most-popular Apple program of 1983. Ahoy! in 1984 called Drol "an amusing little game." Electronic Fun with Computers & Games gave it 4 out of 4. Reviewer Marc Berman wrote:

David Stone reviewed the game for Computer Gaming World, and stated that "the high quality of the animation, the cleverness of the animated foes, and the nonsense of the theme, all make Drol well-worth the money."

References

External links
Drol at Atari Mania

Drol at Lemon Amiga
Drol at Sega Retro
Video from the C64 version on archive.org

1983 video games
Amiga games
Apple II games
Atari 8-bit family games
Broderbund games
Commodore 64 games
NEC PC-8801 games
SG-1000 games
Video games developed in the United States